Dr. Hemoprova Saikia (born 21 February 1940) is an Indian politician who served as the Minister of Handloom and Textiles,Government of Assam from 2001 to 2006. She was a member of Assam Legislative Assembly representing Nazira constituency from 1996 to 2006.She was also chairman of Assam Tourism Development Corporation. She was the wife of former Chief Minister of Assam, Hiteswar Saikia and her son Debabrata Saikia is current Leader of Opposition in the Assam Legislative Assembly.

References

Living people
Assam MLAs 1996–2001
Assam MLAs 2001–2006
Indian National Congress politicians from Assam
State cabinet ministers of Assam
People from Sivasagar
21st-century Indian women politicians
21st-century Indian politicians
Women members of the Assam Legislative Assembly
1940 births